San Kheyl (also Romanized as Sān Kheyl; also known as Sāneh Kheyl) is a village in Kolijan Rostaq-e Sofla Rural District, in the Central District of Sari County, Mazandaran Province, Iran. At the 2006 census, its population was 314, in 72 families.

References 

Populated places in Sari County